St Peter and St Paul, Bristol is the church of Bristol's principal Greek Orthodox congregation. It is situated in the Lower Ashley Road.

The building was constructed in the 1840s as the Church of St Simon. It was designed by S.J.Hicks and S.B Gabriel with a nave, chancel, north aisle and chapel.

The church is part of the Greek Orthodox Archdiocese of Thyateira and Great Britain. The Greek Orthodox community in Bristol grew up in the 19th century from sailors arriving in the port. Services were held in Anglican churches, particularly the Temple of St Simon during the 1950s and 1960s. In 1963 it was renamed for the Apostles St Peter and Paul and in 1978 purchased by the Greek Orthodox church.

The churchyard wall has coping blocks formed from copper-slag, the same material used to construct the Black Castle Public House.

See also
 Churches in Bristol

References

External links

 Greek Orthodox Church of Saint Peter and Saint Paul in Bristol

Churches in Bristol
Greek Orthodox churches in the United Kingdom